Cromers is the name of two unincorporated communities in the United States

 Cromers, Georgia
 Cromers, Ohio

See also
 Cromer (disambiguation)